Bay Crest Park is an unincorporated community in Hillsborough County, Florida,  United States.

Designation and population
Although a separate community, it is a part of the census-designated place (CDP) of Town 'n' Country. The ZIP code for the community is 33615. The area reported as a census-designated place by the U.S. Census Bureau in 1980 as "Bay Crest", which included the southern portion of Town 'n' Country's census area. The population recorded was 5,927.

As of the 2010 census the community had a population of 2,744 with a population density of 6,499 persons per square mile.

Geography
Bay Crest Park is located at 28 degrees north, 82.6 degrees west (27.999, -82.578); or approximately eight miles northwest of Tampa. The elevation for the community is seven feet above sea level. The community has an land area of 0.422 square miles.

Education
The community of Bay Crest Park is served by Hillsborough County Schools.

References

External links
Community website.

Unincorporated communities in Hillsborough County, Florida
Unincorporated communities in Florida
Former census-designated places in Florida